The fils (Arabic: فلس) is a subdivision of currency used in some Arab countries, such as Iraq and Bahrain. The term is a modern retranscription of fals, an early medieval Arab coin.

"Fils" is the singular form in Arabic, not plural (as its final consonant might indicate to an English speaker). The plural form of fils is fulūs (فلوس); the latter term can also refer to small amounts of money or to money in general in Egyptian and Iraqi and many other varieties of Arabic.

 1 Bahraini dinar = 1000 fulūs (or 1 fils =  Bahraini dinar)
 1 Emirati dirham = 100 fulus 
 1 Iraqi dinar = 1000 fulūs
 1 Jordanian dinar = 1000 fulūs
 1 Kuwaiti dinar = 1000 fulūs
 1 Yemeni rial = 100 fulūs

See also
 Falus

Denominations (currency)